Ojaswi Aroraa (born 6 August 1985) (previously called Ojaswi Oberoi) is an Indian television actress who has appeared in many Indian television series. She debuted on the small screen with Behenein on Star Plus. She has also acted in Aasman Se Aage, Devon Ke Dev...Mahadev, SuperCops vs Supervillains and Aahat.

Career
Aroraa completed her graduation from Punjab University (1999–2003) before taking acting classes and settling as a TV artist.

She has been practicing Kathak dance for over 15 years and has performed in many stage shows (including STAR Parivaar Awards in 2011).

Television
 Behenein as Anokhi
 Har Yug Mein Aayega Ek - Arjun (cameo)
 Aasman Se Aage as Meenakshi
 Devon Ke Dev...Mahadev as Mohini (cameo)
 SuperCops vs Supervillains as Meghna (cameo)
 Crime Patrol Meghna Verma (cameo)
 CID (Episode 1225 - Satara Mein CID) as Deepika (cameo)
 Aahat as Neha (cameo)
 Arjun as Meera (episodic)
 Pyaar Tune Kya Kiya as Shikha (episodic role)
 Adaalat as Renuka Jhukla (episodic)
 Brahmarakshas as Naina Yug Srivastav 
 Badho Bahu as Kareena Sangwan
 Kya Hal, Mister Panchal as Pari Panchal
 Comedy Circus as herself
 Tera Kya Hoga Alia as Sonia
Kuch Smiles Ho Jayein... With Alia as Sonia

See also 
 List of Hindi television actresses
 List of Indian television actresses

References

Living people
1985 births
Indian television actresses
Actresses from Mumbai